Louis-Joseph Maurin (15 February 1859 – 16 November 1936) was a Roman Catholic Cardinal and Archbishop of Lyon.

Biography
Maurin was ordained to the priesthood on 8 April 1882 in Rome. He did pastoral work in the diocese of Marseille from 1882 until 1911. On 1 September 1911 Pope Pius X appointed him Bishop of Grenoble, being consecrated by Pierre Andrieu in October of that year.

He remained in Grenoble until Pope Benedict XV appointed him Archbishop of Lyon on 1 December 1916. Three days later he was created and proclaimed Cardinal-Priest of SS. Trinità al Monte Pincio. Cardinal Maurin voted in the conclave of 1922 that elected Pope Pius XI.

He died in office on 16 November 1936.

References

1859 births
1936 deaths
20th-century French cardinals
Bishops of Grenoble
Archbishops of Lyon
20th century in Lyon